Estación Molina,  is a railway station of the Empresa de los Ferrocarriles del Estado, located in Molina, Chile. It is located on Luis Cruz Martinez avenue.

Estación Molina is part of the Red Sur EFE, the TerraSur inter-city service has a stop here.

This station is between Ruta 5 and downtown Molina.

In 2010, Estacion Molina began to take passengers.

Lines and trains 
The following lines and trains pass through or terminate at Estación Molina:

Red Sur EFE
TerraSur inter-city service (Alameda - Estación Chillán)
Expreso Maule inter-city service (Alameda - Estación Linares)

External links 
 Empresa de los Ferrocarriles del Estado

Molina
Molina
Molina
Molina